Tranquillity (also spelled tranquility) is the quality or state of being tranquil; that is, calm, serene, and worry-free. The word tranquillity appears in numerous texts ranging from the religious writings of Buddhism, where the term passaddhi refers to tranquillity of the body, thoughts and consciousness on the path to enlightenment, to an assortment of policy and planning guidance documents, where interpretation of the word is typically linked to engagement with the natural environment.  It is also famously used in the Preamble to the US Constitution - "insure domestic Tranquility".

History
The word tranquility dates back to the 12th century in the Old French word tranquilite, meaning "peace" or "happiness", although the word's sense evolved in the late 14th century.

However, the word still keeps its reference to the absence of disturbance and peacefulness.

Benefits
Psychological being in a tranquil or "restorative" environment allows individuals to take respite from the periods of sustained "directed attention" that characterise modern living. In developing their Attention Restoration Theory (ART), Kaplan and Kaplan proposed that recovery from cognitive overload could most effectively be achieved by engaging with natural restorative environments, that are away from daily distractions and have the extent and mystery that allows the imagination to wander, thereby enabling individuals to engage effortlessly with their surroundings. The theory works on the principle that the amount of reflection possible within such an environment depends upon the type of cognitive engagement, i.e. fascination; that the environment holds. "Soft fascination" is deemed to occur when there is enough interest in the surroundings to hold attention but not so much that it compromises the ability to reflect. In essence, soft fascination, which has been taken by Herzog and Pheasant as a reasonable term to describe tranquillity, provides a pleasing level of sensory input that involves no cognitive effort other than removing oneself from an overcrowded mental space.

Enjoyment
For many, the chance to experience tranquillity is what makes the countryside different from cities. In a survey by the United Kingdom Department for Environment, Food and Rural Affairs (DEFRA) 58% of people said that tranquillity was the most positive feature of the countryside.

Health
In contrast to "soft fascination", "directed attention" requires a significant amount of cognitive effort and it is known that prolonged periods of sustained mental activity can lead to directed attention fatigue. This condition has the potential to significantly affect performance and bring about negative emotions, irritability and decreased sensitivity to interpersonal cues. As the incidence of mental illness continues to rise, there is growing evidence that exposure to natural environments can make a significant contribution to health and wellbeing. Mounting evidence shows, that exposure to nature contributes to physical and psychological wellbeing, such as the review carried out by Louv, that found evidence of "nature-deficit-disorder" in children, which suggests that the importance of being able to engage with restorative environments applies across a wide age range. 
Others report that natural tranquil surroundings have profound physiological effects on people suffering from stress. For example, Ullrich found that stress (as measured by blood pressure, muscle tension and skin conductance response), induced by showing videos of workplace injuries, improved significantly quicker following further viewing if videos included natural surroundings rather than busy traffic or shopping scenes. A recent study has demonstrated the benefits of simulating such environments for pain relief during bone marrow aspirate and biopsy.

Economic
Since seeking tranquillity is an important reason why many people visit the countryside, the presence of tranquil areas helps boost rural tourism. Since rural tourism in the UK directly supports 380,000 jobs and £13.8 billion annually to the economy, and a recent survey showed that tranquillity is the main reason why 49% of visitors go are attracted to the countryside, one can conclude that tranquillity is worth 186,200 jobs and £6.76 billion a year to the economy.

Tranquillity research
Natural settings that effortlessly engage our attention are typically associated with soft fascination and with the analysis of tranquillity and preference published by Herzog and Bosely (1992). In this study, the authors attempted to distinguish empirically between the constructs of tranquillity and preference as affective qualities of natural environments. Motivated by ART, from which they took tranquillity as a reasonable term to describe soft fascination, they produced definitions for each component. Tranquillity they defined as "how much you think this setting is a quiet, peaceful place, a good place to get away from everyday life", and preference as "how much you like this setting for whatever reason".
Subjects were asked to score the following visual settings: mountains, deserts, fields / forests and waterscapes against the two target variables, tranquillity and preference, and four descriptor variables: mistiness, unstructured openness, focus and surface calmness. Tranquillity and preference were positively correlated across all settings with tranquillity scoring higher ratings in the field / forest, waterscape and mountain categories, whilst rushing water had the highest rating in the preference category.
Analysis of the results identified three physical features that help explain the apparent split between tranquillity and preference. These were; mistiness, unstructured openness; which refers to how open the scene is and how difficult it is to establish a sense of depth or distance, and surface calmness. Mistiness and unstructured openness tended to depress preference relative to tranquillity whilst surface calmness tended to enhance it. Herzog and Barnes conducted a follow up study in which deserts and waterscapes were included in the setting types. In 2000, Herzog and Chernick conducted further research into the tranquillity construct when they investigated the relationship between tranquillity and danger in urban and rural settings.
The key results that emerged from this research were that "setting care", which relates to how safe we feel in a particular setting, is more salient for judgments of danger in urban settings than natural ones and that openness was a significant predictor of danger but not of tranquillity. The authors concluded therefore that tranquillity and danger should not simply be viewed as polar opposites, but like preference and tranquillity as distinct constructs.

The role of audio-visual interaction within the tranquillity construct

Within tranquillity studies, much of the emphasis has been placed on understanding the role of vision in the perception of natural environments, which is probably not surprising, considering that upon first viewing a scene its configurational coherence can be established with incredible speed. Indeed, scene information can be captured in a single glance and the gist of a scene determined in as little as 100ms. The speed of processing of complex natural images was tested by Thorpe et al. using colour photographs of a wide range of animals (mammals, birds, reptiles and fish), in their natural environments, mixed with distracters that included pictures of forests, mountains, lakes, buildings and fruit. During this experiment, subjects were shown an image for 20ms and asked to determine whether it contained an animal or not. The electrophysiological brain responses obtained in this study showed that a decision could be made within 150ms of the image being seen, indicating the speed at which cognitive visual processing occurs.
However, audition, and in particular the individual components that collectively comprise the soundscape, a term coined by Schafer to describe the ever-present array of sounds that constitute the sonic environment, also significantly inform the various schemata used to characterise differing landscape types. This interpretation is supported by the auditory reaction times, which are 50 to 60ms faster than that of the visual modality. It is also known that sound can alter visual perception and that under certain conditions areas of the brain involved in processing auditory information can be activated in response to visual stimuli. 
Research conducted by Pheasant et al. has shown that when individuals make tranquillity assessments based on a uni-modal auditory or visual sensory input, they characterise the environment by drawing upon a number of key landscape and soundscape characteristics. For example, when making assessments in response to visual-only stimuli the percentage of water, flora and geological features present within a scene, positively influence how tranquil a location is perceived to be. Likewise when responding to uni-modal auditory stimuli, the perceived loudness of biological sounds positively influences the perception of tranquillity, whilst the perceived loudness of mechanical sounds have a negative effect. However, when presented with bi-modal auditory-visual stimuli the individual soundscape and landscape components alone no longer influenced the perception of tranquillity. Rather configurational coherence was provided by the percentage of natural and contextual features present within the scene and the equivalent continuous sound pressure level (LAeq).

Predicting tranquillity

Researchers at the Bradford Centre for Sustainable Environments have developed a methodology by which the perceived tranquillity rating (TR) of an amenity area such as park, green or urban square can be measured, on a 0–10 scale. The method involves the assessment of average daytime noise levels Lday (usually traffic noise) and the measurement of the percentage of natural and contextual features NCF contained within the visual scene. The latter includes the percentage area in the visual scene occupied by natural features in the landscape such as vegetation, water and geological features, e.g. exposed rock outcrops, and contextual features. These contextual elements include listed buildings, religious and historic buildings, landmarks, monuments and elements of the landscape, such as traditional farm buildings, that directly contribute to the visual context of the natural environment. Lastly, the equation includes moderating factors (MF) that can influence the perception of tranquillity in either a positive, or a negative way:
	
 TR = 9.68 + 0.041 NCF − 0.146 Lday + MF.

These moderating factors are not expected to be large and because they are relatively difficult to quantify they are the subject of ongoing research. One potentially effective solution to improving tranquillity, is to mask traffic noise or distract attention with an attractive water sound. A previous experiment has demonstrated that water generated sounds have the potential to improve the perceived tranquillity of gardens blighted by noise.  A further study has demonstrated that litter has the potential to degrade an environment such that the tranquillity rating drops on average by one scale point.

This bi-modal relationship is supported by work recently carried out by SCANLab at the University of Sheffield, using fMRI neuro-imaging techniques. This study demonstrated for the first time the significant differences in effective connectivity between areas of the brain, namely the auditory cortex and the medial pre-frontal cortex, under tranquil and non-tranquil conditions. Specifically the medial pre-frontal cortex receives significantly enhanced contributions from the auditory cortex when presented with a tranquil visual scene compared with non-tranquil visual stimuli.

Mapping tranquillity

The first method of mapping tranquillity was developed by Simon Rendel of ASH Consulting for a Department of Transport study in 1991. This led to the production of a set of Tranquil Area maps covering England, produced by Rendel and ASH Consulting and published by the Campaign to Protect Rural England (CPRE) and the former Countryside Commission.

In these maps tranquil areas were defined as places sufficiently far from the visual or noise intrusion of development or traffic to be considered unspoilt by urban influences.

More sophisticated mapping techniques are now available following work by researchers at Northumbria University, Newcastle University, and CPRE.

Maps have been produced for the whole of England that show the tranquillity score of Ordnance Survey Grid derived 500mx500m squares. The tranquillity rating for these is based on 44 different factors that add to or detract from people’s feelings of tranquillity. These factors were defined following extensive public consultations.

The new methodology uses advanced modelling techniques to look at the diffusion of the impact of these factors over distance, taking into account the terrain of the land. For example, the tranquillity increases gradually the further one is from a busy road, but increases more sharply if the road is hidden in a cutting.

The mapping process was developed by Northumbria and Newcastle Universities. The dark green areas represent those with the highest composite tranquillity score; dark red areas have the lowest composite tranquillity score (i.e., are least tranquil).

Stimuli with positive impacts on tranquillity
 a natural landscape, including woodland
 presence of rivers, streams, lakes or the sea
 birds and other wildlife
 wide open spaces
 clear open night sky with/without moon
 beach in a unique location
 open field, flora etc. with gentle to moderate wind flow

Examples of stimuli having negative impacts on tranquillity
 Motorised transport: cars, motorcycle, trains and aircraft – and roads and railways
 light pollution
 large numbers of people
 pylons, power lines, masts and wind turbines
 noise

Note: This cartographic study showed that tranquillity is not the absence of all noise, activity and buildings. Indeed, it found that many rural activities, such as farming and hiking, and natural noises such as birdsong and cows lowing, enhance people’s experience of tranquillity.

See also
 Ataraxia
 Euthymia (philosophy)
 Hesychia
 Inner peace
 Passaddhi
 Upeksa

Notes
Original figures from The Rural Strategy 2004, DEFRA

References

Environmental psychology
Virtue